Seventy members of the New Zealand House of Representatives elected in the 2011 general election were from single member constituencies, the same number as in 2008. The initial composition of the 2008 Parliament gave the National Party 41 seats, the Labour Party 21, the Māori Party five and ACT, United Future and the Progressive Party one each.

The election was held on 26 November 2011. Nominations officially opened on 27 October, and the deadline for nominations was 12:00 noon on 1 November.

General electorates

Auckland Central

|-
|colspan=6|

|}
Electorate (as at 21 October 2011): 42,994

Bay of Plenty

|}
Electorate (as at 21 October 2011): 46,546

Botany

|}
Electorate (as at 21 October 2011): 43,204

Christchurch Central

|}
Electorate (as at 11 November 2011): 38,775

Christchurch East

|}
Electorate (as at 11 November 2011): 39,605

Clutha-Southland

|}
Electorate (as at 21 October 2011): 42,664

Coromandel

|-
|colspan=6|

|}
Electorate (as at 21 October 2011): 45,117

Dunedin North

|-
|colspan=6|

|}
Electorate (as at 21 October 2011): 39,926

Dunedin South

|}
Electorate (as at 21 October 2011): 45,132

East Coast

|}
Electorate (as at 21 October 2011): 40,533

East Coast Bays

|}
Electorate (as at 21 October 2011): 46,232

Epsom

|-
|colspan=6|

|}
Electorate (as at 11 November 2011): 47,600

Hamilton East

|-
|colspan=6|

|}
Electorate (as at 11 November 2011): 44,689

Hamilton West

|-
|colspan=6|

|}
Electorate (as at 11 November 2011): 44,293

Helensville

|}
Electorate (as at 11 November 2011): 46,983

Hunua

|}
Electorate (as at 11 November 2011): 46,578

Hutt South

|}
Electorate (as at 11 November 2011): 42,391

Ilam

|}
Electorate (as at 11 November 2011): 44,692

Invercargill

|}
Electorate (as at 11 November 2011): 44,731

Kaikōura

|}
Electorate (as at 11 November 2011): 44,588

Mana

|}
Electorate (as at 11 November 2011): 43,664

Māngere

|}
Electorate (as at 11 November 2011): 38,722

Manukau East

|}
Electorate (as at 11 November 2011): 41,070

Manurewa

|-
|colspan=6|

|}
Electorate (as at 11 November 2011): 38,767

Maungakiekie

|-
|colspan=6|

|}
Electorate (as at 11 November 2011): 45,630

Mount Albert

|}
Electorate (as at 11 November 2011): 44,129

Mount Roskill

|}
Electorate (as at 11 November 2011): 45,292

Napier

|}
Electorate (as at 11 November 2011): 43,824

Nelson

|}
Electorate (as at 11 November 2011): 46,301

New Lynn

|-
|colspan=6|

|}
Electorate (as at 11 November 2011): 45,226

New Plymouth

|}
Electorate (as at 11 November 2011): 44,973

North Shore

|-

|colspan=6|

|}
Electorate (as at 11 November 2011): 48,453

Northcote

|}
Electorate (as at 11 November 2011): 44,925

Northland

|-
|colspan=6|

|}
Electorate (as at 11 November 2011): 43,628

Ōhariu

|-
|colspan=6|

|}
Electorate (as at 11 November 2011): 45,900

Ōtaki

|}
Electorate (as at 11 November 2011): 47,118

Pakuranga

|}
Electorate (as at 11 November 2011): 45,420

Palmerston North

|}
Electorate (as at 11 November 2011): 42,897

Papakura

|}
Electorate (as at 11 November 2011): 43,528

Port Hills

|}
Electorate (as at 11 November 2011): 43,027

Rangitata

|}
Electorate (as at 11 November 2011): 47,712

Rangitīkei

|-
| colspan=6|

|}
Electorate (as at 11 November 2011): 41,013

Rimutaka

|-
|colspan=6|

|}
Electorate (as at 11 November 2011): 43,709

Rodney

|-
| colspan=6|

|}
Electorate (as at 11 November 2011): 48,829

Rongotai

|}
Electorate (as at 11 November 2011): 44,825

Rotorua

|-
|colspan=6|

|}
Electorate (as at 11 November 2011): 42,548

Selwyn

|}
Electorate (as at 11 November 2011): 46,345

Tāmaki

|-
|colspan=6|

|}
Electorate (as at 11 November 2011): 48,348

Taranaki-King Country

|}
Electorate (as at 11 November 2011): 41,152

Taupō

|}
Electorate (as at 11 November 2011): 45,381

Tauranga

|}
Electorate (as at 11 November 2011): 47,514

Te Atatū

|-
|colspan=6|

|}
Electorate (as at 11 November 2011): 42,742

Tukituki

|}
Electorate (as at 11 November 2011): 44,264

Waikato

|}
Electorate (as at 11 November 2011): 41,623

Waimakariri

|}
Electorate (as at 11 November 2011): 46,911

Wairarapa

|}
Electorate (as at 11 November 2011): 46,165

Waitakere

|}
Electorate (as at 11 November 2011): 42,201

Waitaki

|}
Electorate (as at 11 November 2011): 49,209

Wellington Central

|-
|colspan=6|

|}
Electorate (as at 11 November 2011): 46,212

West Coast-Tasman

|-
|colspan=6|

|}
Electorate (as at 11 November 2011): 44,144

Whanganui

|}
Electorate (as at 11 November 2011): 43,350

Whangarei

|}
Electorate (as at 11 November 2011): 46,068

Wigram

|-
| colspan=6|

|}
Electorate (as at 11 November 2011): 44,563

Māori electorates

Hauraki-Waikato

|}
Electorate (as at 11 November 2011): 32,513

Ikaroa-Rāwhiti

|}
Electorate (as at 11 November 2011): 32,364

Tāmaki Makaurau

|}
Electorate (as at 11 November 2011): 34,628

Te Tai Hauāuru

|}
Electorate (as at 11 November 2011): 32,002

Te Tai Tokerau

|}
Electorate (as at 11 November 2011): 33,067

Te Tai Tonga

|}
Electorate (as at 11 November 2011): 30,956

Waiariki

|}
Electorate (as at 11 November 2011): 32,568

References

2011 New Zealand general election
Candidates 2011